Prospero is a fictional character and the protagonist of William Shakespeare's play The Tempest.
Prospero is the rightful Duke of Milan, whose usurping brother, Antonio, had put him (with his three-year-old daughter, Miranda) to sea on a "rotten carcass" of a boat to die, twelve years before the play begins. Prospero and Miranda had survived and found exile on a small island. He has learned sorcery from books, and uses it while on the island to protect Miranda and control the other characters.

Before the play has begun, Prospero has freed the magical spirit Ariel from entrapment within "a cloven pine". Ariel is beholden to Prospero after he is freed from his imprisonment inside the pine tree. Prospero then takes Ariel as a slave. Prospero's sorcery is sufficiently powerful to control Ariel and other spirits, as well as to alter weather and even raise the dead: "Graves at my command have waked their sleepers, oped, and let 'em forth, by my so potent Art." - Act V, scene 1.

On the island, Prospero becomes master of the monster Caliban (the son of Sycorax, a malevolent witch) and forces Caliban into submission by punishing him with magic if he does not obey.

At the end of the play, Prospero intends to drown his books and renounce magic. In the view of the audience, this may have been required to make the ending unambiguously happy, as magic was associated with diabolical works.

Prospero's speech 
The Tempest is believed to be the last play Shakespeare wrote alone. In this play there are two candidate soliloquies by Prospero which critics have taken to be Shakespeare's own "retirement speech".

One speech is the "Cloud-capp'd towers...".

           Our revels now are ended: These our actors—,
           As I foretold you—, were all spirits and
           Are melted into air, into thin air;
           And, like the baseless fabric of this vision,
           The cloud-capp'd towers, the gorgeous palaces,
           The solemn temples, the great globe itself,
           Yea, all which it inherit, shall dissolve
           And, like this insubstantial pageant faded,
           Leave not a rack behind: we are such stuff
           As dreams are made on, and our little life
           Is rounded with a sleep. — The Tempest, Act 4, Scene 1

The final soliloquy and epilogue is the other candidate.

           Now my charms are all o'erthrown,
           And what strength I have's mine own,
           Which is most faint: now, 'tis true,
           I must be here confined by you,
           Or sent to Naples. Let me not,
           Since I have my dukedom got
           And pardon'd the deceiver, dwell
           In this bare island by your spell;
           But release me from my bands
           With the help of your good hands:
           Gentle breath of yours my sails
           Must fill, or else my project fails,
           Which was to please. Now I want
           Spirits to enforce, art to enchant,
           And my ending is despair,
           Unless I be relieved by prayer,
           Which pierces so that it assaults
           Mercy itself and frees all faults.
           As you from crimes would pardon'd be,
           Let your indulgence set me free.

Portrayals

Stage 
Portrayals of Prospero in Royal Shakespeare Company productions include:
 Robert Harris (1948)
 Sir Michael Redgrave (1951)
 Sir Ralph Richardson (1952)
 Sir John Gielgud (1956, 1957)
 Tom Fleming (1963)
 Ian Richardson (1970)
 Michael Aldridge (1974)
 Sir Michael Hordern (1978)
 Derek Jacobi (1982)
 John Wood (1988)
 Alec McCowen (1993)
 Paul Jesson (1995)
 David Calder (1998)
 Philip Voss (2000), a production that utilized vocal music rather than instrumental
 Malcolm Storry (2002)
 Sir Patrick Stewart (2006) in Rupert Goold's very loose 2006 interpretation
 Antony Sher (2009)
 Jonathan Slinger (2012) directed by David Farr.
 Simon Russell Beale (2016), a production directed by Gregory Doran that used Digital technology to create many of the special effects.

Portrayals of Prospero at the Old Vic include:
 Sir John Gielgud (1931, 1940, 1974)
 Max von Sydow (1988)
 Sir Derek Jacobi (2003)
 Stephen Dillane (2010)

Portrayals of Prospero for the New York Shakespeare Festival include:
 James Earl Jones (1962)
 Raul Julia (1981)
 Patrick Stewart (1995) at the Delacorte Theater, later moved to Broadway's Broadhurst Theater.
 Sam Waterston (2015)

Portrayals of Prospero for the Globe Theatre include:
 Vanessa Redgrave (2000); she also played "Ariel" to her father Sir Michael Redgrave's "Prospero" in the 1964 Caedmon recording.
 Roger Allam (2013), videotaped and later broadcast as part of their Live Cinema broadcasts.

Portrayals of Prospero for the Stratford Shakespeare Festival include:
 William Hutt (1962, 1976, 1999, 2005)
 Len Cariou (1982), videotaped and broadcast on television in 1983
 Alan Scarfe (1992)
 Christopher Plummer (2010), videotaped and broadcast on television
 Martha Henry (2018)

Other stage portrayals of Prospero include:
 Graham Crowden (1970), at London's Mermaid Theatre, directed by Jonathan Miller.
 Sir John Gielgud (1974), at the National Theatre.
 Sam Waterston (1974), Off-Broadway at the Mitzi E. Newhouse Theater at Lincoln Center.
 Sir Anthony Hopkins (1979), opposite Stephanie Zimbalist as Miranda at the Mark Taper Forum in Los Angeles.
 Frank Langella (1989), opposite B. D. Wong as Ariel with the Roundabout Theatre Company in New York City.
 Blair Brown as "Prospera" (2003), at the McCarter Theatre Center in Princeton, New Jersey.
 Ralph Fiennes (2011), at the Theatre Royal Haymarket directed by Trevor Nunn.
 Harriet Walter (2017), in Phyllida Lloyd's Donmar Warehouse production, which was set in an all-women's prison and performed by the inmates.
 Kate Burton as "Prospera" (2018), at the Old Globe Theatre in San Diego.

Film and television 
 Maurice Evans, 1960 (TV, Hallmark Hall of Fame)
 Sir Michael Redgrave, 1968 (BBC-TV, Play of the Month)
 Heathcote Williams, 1979 (film version directed by Derek Jarman)
 Sir Michael Hordern, 1980 (BBC-TV, BBC Television Shakespeare)
 Efrem Zimbalist Jr., 1983 (videotaped production for Bard Productions)
 John Gielgud, 1991 (film adaptation Prospero's Books directed by Peter Greenaway)
 Timothy West, 1992 (voice of Prospero in abridged animated production for Shakespeare: The Animated Tales)
 Helen Mirren, 2010 (film adaptation directed by Julie Taymor, renamed "Prospera")
 Patrick Robinson, 2018 (Filmed for CBeebies at the Lawrence Batley Theatre, Huddersfield, in front of a live invited audience)

Prospero-esque characters have included:
 Paul Mazursky's film Tempest (1982) starring John Cassavetes as "Philip Dimitrius", who is an exile of his own cynical discontent, ego and self-betrayal and who abandons America for a utopian "kingdom" on a secluded Greek isle.
 The 1998 TV movie The Tempest, set in a Mississippi bayou during the American Civil War, based on Shakespeare's play and starring Peter Fonda as "Gideon Prosper", a Prospero-esque plantation owner who has learned voodoo from his slaves.

Audio 
Audio portrayals of Prospero include:
 Sir John Gielgud in four BBC Radio productions: 1933 (on the BBC National Programme), 1948 (on the BBC Home Service), 1953 and 1989 (on the BBC World Service).
 John Barrymore (1937) (an abridged version of The Tempest on the 12 July episode of the short-lived NBC radio series Streamlined Shakespeare; this episode was re-broadcast on 31 August 1950 with the series' name changed to John Barrymore and Shakespeare)
 Sir Cedric Hardwicke (1940) (a one-hour adaptation of The Tempest on the 24 November episode of the NBC radio series Great Plays)
 Norman Shelley (1951) (BBC Third Programme)
 Sir Michael Hordern (1960) (Argo Records recording)
 Sir Michael Redgrave (1964) (Caedmon Records recording [SRS-201])
 Alec Clunes (1964) (BBC Home Service).
 Paul Scofield (1974) (BBC Radio 3)
 Ronald Pickup (1996) (BBC Radio 3 Sunday Play)
 Bob Peck (1999) (The Complete Arkangel Shakespeare series recording)
 Philip Madoc (2001) (BBC Radio 3 Sunday Play, adapted for radio and directed by David Hunter)
 Sir Ian McKellen (2004) (Naxos Records recording)
 David Warner (2012) (BBC Radio 3 Drama on 3, broadcast as part of the Shakespeare Unlocked series, adapted for radio and directed by Jeremy Mortimer)

In popular culture 
 In the comic book series The League of Extraordinary Gentlemen by Alan Moore and Kevin O'Neill, Prospero appears as a founding member of the first such grouping in 1610, alongside his familiars Caliban and Ariel.
 Paul Prospero, the protagonist of The Vanishing of Ethan Carter (2014), is named after Prospero.
 In John Bellairs's novel The Face in the Frost (1969), one of the protagonists is a wizard named Prospero ("and not the one you're thinking of") .
 In the universe of Warhammer: 40,000 and further fleshed out in The Horus Heresy series, several books take place on a planet called Prospero, home of Magnus the Red and his Thousand Sons Space Marine chapter. The citizens of the planet are versed in sorcery and psychic powers, earning them the suspicion and ire of the rest of the Imperium of Man.
 Melon Cauliflower, by New Zealand playwright Tom McCrory, is about a man Prospero, in his late sixties, who struggles to come to terms with the death of his wife and has mistreated his daughter Miranda.
 "The Masque of the Red Death", by Edgar Allan Poe, is set at the manor of a Prince Prospero
 In the television series Star Trek: The Next Generation by Gene Roddenberry and CBS / Paramount Pictures, Prospero appears briefly played by Lt. Cmdr. Data (Brent Spiner) during the beginning of Season 7 Episode 23 entitled "Emergence". He recites some lines of Prospero's speech before asking Captain Picard (Patrick Stewart) to provide some insight into the character of Prospero and Shakespeare's The Tempest in general.
 In the mobile game Star Trek Timelines a character was released in February 2017 called Prospero Data, recalling the character's appearance in the previously mentioned Star Trek: The Next Generation episode.
 A good wizard named Prospero appears in Polish children's animated cartoon  based on the books by Ewa Karwan-Jastrzębska.
 Prospero is the main antagonist in season 2 of TV series The Librarians.  This version of Prospero (Richard Cox) is a Fictional, a character brought to life by magic, and has become bitter over the way his story was written, as he feels it was made without his consent. After regaining his book and obtaining the Staff of Zarathustra, he imprisons the Librarians within his illusions, but his servant Ariel (an actual fairy rather than a character) rebels and frees them. Prospero subsequently begins to reshape the world in his image, while also possessing his creator Shakespeare in order to change the past. The Librarians destroy his staff and exorcise him from Shakespeare's body, banishing him back to his original story.
 In episode 1 of the video game Life is Strange: Before the Storm, the drama students of Blackwell Academy are seen rehearsing for their upcoming play, The Tempest. The character, Rachel Amber, playing Prospero.
 In the manga series One Piece, a character with the name Perospero appears in chapter 834, partly inspired by Prospero. His mother, Charlotte Linlin also seems to be inspired by the character as she is the one to use magic to control everything on the Island with her soul.
 The novels and television series The Expanse use several Shakespearean allusions, including "Caliban" in reference to monstrous human-alien hybrids, and correspondingly "Prospero Station", a research facility that was developing and controlling them.
In the national bestseller The Night Circus by Erin Morgenstern, magician Hector Bowen, father of protagonist Celia Bowen, goes by the name of Prospero whilst performing.
In the season 30 episode of The Simpsons titled "I'm Just a Girl Who Can't Say D'oh", Sideshow Mel leaves a play Marge is directing to play Prospero and is replaced by Professor Frink.
In the strategy game Into the Breach: There is a possibility to gain a red colored robotic pilot named Prospero by default. This pilot has the special ability of giving the mech he pilots flight.
In the flight simulator Project Wingman, a major city of Cascadia, an allied nation to the protagonist, is named Prospero.
In the anime series Mobile Suit Gundam: The Witch from Mercury, the main character's mother goes by the name Prospera Mercury. She has sent her daughter, Suletta Mercury, to a piloting school alongside a Gundam named Aerial.

References

External links

 Shakespeare Birthplace Trust - past RSC productions

Literary characters introduced in 1611
Literary archetypes by name
Fictional characters who use magic
Fictional Italian people in literature
Male Shakespearean characters
Fictional dukes and duchesses
Fictional castaways
Characters in The Tempest